Thackeray is a 2019 Indian biographical film written and directed by Abhijit Panse and made simultaneously in Marathi and Hindi. The film follows the life of Balasaheb Thackeray, the founder of the Indian political party Shiv Sena. The film stars Nawazuddin Siddiqui as Thackeray and Amrita Rao as his wife. The film released on 25 January 2019, right after the 93rd birthday of Bal Thackeray.

Plot 
The film is a biopic based on Marathi politician Balasaheb Thackeray.

Cast
Nawazuddin Siddiqui as Bal Thackeray
Amrita Rao as Meena Thackeray
Mukund Gosavi as Prabodhankar Thackeray
Sachin A. Jayavant as Uddhav Thackeray
Vishal Sudarshanwar as Raj Thackeray
Rajesh Khera as Morarji Desai
Sanjay Narvekar as Krishna Desai
Praveen Tarde as Dattaji Salvi
Sandeep Khare as Manohar Joshi
Prakash Belawadi as George Fernandes
Nikhil Mahajan as Sharad Pawar
Avantika Akerekar as Indira Gandhi
Sudhir Mishra as Mastan
Sanjay Kulkarni as Diwakar Raote
Mohaniraj Khare as Pramod Navalkar
Prabhakar More as Wamanrao Mahadik
Ashok Lokhande as Yashwantrao Chavan
Praful Samant as Vasantrao Naik
Abdul Quadir Amin as Jaidev Thackeray
Vidyadhar Paranjape as Subhash Desai
Balaji Deshpande as Rajni Patel
Anand Vikas Potdukhe as Jambuwantrao Dhote
Anil Sutar as Dada Kondke
Chetan Sharma as Dilip Vengsarkar
Ashish Pathode as Javed Miandad
Jaywant Wadkar as Police officer
Vineet Sharma as DCP Emmanuel Modak

Soundtrack 

The music of the film was composed by Rohan-Rohan and Sandeep Shirodkar with lyrics by Dr Sunil Jogi, Manoj Yadav and Manndar Cholkar. The film's score was composed by Amar Mohile.

Reception

Critical response
Thackeray received mixed reviews from critics. Times of India gave the film 3 stars out of 5 and states: "While the honesty is commendable, it comes across that the lead character's political motivations lack clarity. Perhaps a more seasoned writer, could have fleshed out Thackeray's characters and eccentricities a lot better. But, its Nawaz's nonchalant performance that overshadows the flaws and leaves a lasting impact."

Times Now went with 2.5 stars out of 5 and has to say: "A lot of focus is put on making the film a tearjerker by emphasizing the aftermath of the riots, violence and fights that pretty much summed up Shiv Sena's history under the guidance of founder, Bal Thackeray. The film is good because of Nawazuddin's performance but it cannot be considered as one of the best biopics ever created."

Raut also plans to continue the film with a sequel.

Controversy
Popular Tamil and Telugu actor Siddharth has slammed Bal Thackeray for abusing South Indians. “Nawazuddin has repeated 'Uthao lungi bajao pungi' (lift the lungi and *'#$ him) in the film #Thackeray. Clearly hate speech against South Indians... In a film glorifying the person who said it! Are you planning to make money out of this propaganda? Stop selling hate! Scary stuff!"

References

External links 

 
 
 

2019 films
Films scored by Rohan-Rohan
Films scored by Sandeep Shirodkar
2010s Hindi-language films
Indian biographical films
Indian films based on actual events
Indian political films
Indian multilingual films
Viacom18 Studios films
Biographical films about politicians
Cultural depictions of Indira Gandhi
Cultural depictions of prime ministers of India
2019 multilingual films
2010s Marathi-language films
Bal Thackeray
Morarji Desai
Thackeray family
Cultural depictions of cricketers
Cultural depictions of actors
Cultural depictions of Indian men